"Stand and Deliver" is a 1987 single by the band Mr. Mister, and is the fourth single from Go On.... The song failed to make the US Billboard Hot 100, and was the last single the band released before its breakup. This is the title track in the Edward James Olmos film Stand and Deliver. The song also appears in episodes of Miami Vice (also starring Olmos) and Daria.

Track listing
7" Single

"Stand and Deliver (Remix)" - 4:28
"Power Over Me" - 5:02

References

1987 songs
1987 singles

Mr. Mister songs
RCA Records singles
Songs written by Richard Page (musician)
Songs written by Steve George (keyboardist)